Archibald Edmonstone may refer to:

Sir Archibald Edmonstone, 1st Baronet (1717–1807), Scottish MP
Sir Archibald Edmonstone, 3rd Baronet, Scottish traveller and writer, grandson of the above
Sir Archibald Edmonstone, 5th Baronet, Scottish baronet, nephew of the above (see Edmonstone baronets)
Sir Archibald Edmonstone, 7th Baronet, Scottish baronet, grandson of the above (see Edmonstone baronets)